Luqman is the 31st chapter (sūrah) of the Islamic holy book, the Qur'an. It is composed of 34 verses (āyāt) and takes its title from the mention of the sage Luqman and his advice to his son in verses 12–19. According to Islamic traditional chronology (asbāb al-nuzūl), it was revealed in the middle of Muhammad's Meccan period, and is thus usually classified as a Meccan sura.

Summary
The focus of this sura, once broken down into its many elements, can be seen as emphasizing principles of moderation. The sura uses the mustard seed analogy to emphasize the degree to which God maintains his purview over man's actions, possibly emphasizing the fact that any evil or good deed no matter how small is recorded and will be brought out by Allah in the Day of Judgement. A final point of focus for Sura 31 comes down to the purpose of God's creation. 31:29 and 31:20 show how God's intention through creation was to better mankind, and his signs are theoretically everywhere, from rain to vegetation. This emphasis once again reminds people of their subservience to Allah while also driving home the idea that man is meant to do good on Earth. Man's purpose is to serve God, while the Earth has been created in order to facilitate man's needs.

Ayat (verses)
1-2 The Quran a direction and mercy to the righteous
3-4 The righteous described
5-6 An unbeliever rebuked for his contempt for the Quran
7-8 Blessed rewards of the righteous
9-10 God the Creator of heaven and earth
11 Luqman gifted with wisdom
12, 15-17 Luqmán’s discourse to his son
13-14 Parenthesis on the duty of children to their parents
18 Modesty and humility enjoined
19 God’s favour to mankind
19-20 The unreasonableness of infidel contention
21 The security of true believers
22-23 The certain punishment of unbelief
24-25 Praise to God, the self-sufficient Creator
26 God’s words infinite in number
27 Man’s creation an evidence of God’s sovereignty
28-29 The heavens declare the glory of God
30-31 The ingratitude of idolaters to God
32-34 Men warned to prepare for judgment

Reading Qur'an 31

Like many Quranic narratives, Sura 31 features many intertextual references. Carl Ernst identified what he calls "ring structure" Sura 31 can be reinterpreted based on its inherent conceptual breaks. He proposed breakdown of Surah 31 and its "ring structure": 

A1-11 Omniscience and self-sufficiency  of God for the betterment of mankind pt.1
2-5 The Righteous are mentioned and their good habits are encouraged
6-7 The disbelievers are highlighted, contrasting the early practices of pious practicers
8-11 Paradise is revealed as reward, God's omnipotence is prominently highlighted as being predominantly for the betterment of man 
B12-15 Rules and guidelines
 12-13 Luqman bequeaths knowledge to his son, No partners may be ascribed to God, and He is the highest power
14 Obey and be good to parents, a powerful reference to the struggle of motherhood
15 It explain that God believers should not obey their parents when they try to make them to believe in other partners with God but accompany your parents in life with kindness.
X16-17 The chiastic middle
16 Omnipotence of God is compared to ability to see everything [i.e. the size of a mustard seed]
17 It is revealed through prayer, forbidding wrong, and employing moderation, are the values a believer should aspire too.
B': Rules and guidelines pt. 2 18-19 Employ manners and moderation in society to better follow God
A': 20-34 Omniscience and self-sufficiency  of God for the betterment of mankind pt. 2
20-21 Disbelievers are called out once again and reminded of their punishment
22 Believers counter the disbelievers
23 The Prophet should not be sad that disbelievers are astray
24-34 The Omnipotence and infinite scope of God's power is reiterated
29-32 All of God's acts are for the betterment of mankind
31-34 Judgement day is a bookend, emphasizing the need for right practice and submission to God

References

External links 

Quran 31 Clear Quran translation
Q31:2, 50+ translations, islamawakened.com

Luqman